The Caravanserai Tour was a series of performances by American Latin rock band Santana in support of their album Caravanserai during 1972 and 1973. It started on September 4, 1972, at the Erie Canal Soda Pop Festival in Griffin, Indiana, and ended on October 21, 1973 at Ginasio Municipal Novo in Brasília, Brazil. This tour could be considered to be the group's most eclectic tour at this point, as the band did concerts at every continent except Africa and Antarctica, including one of the first, if not the first, tours of Latin America by a major American rock act.

The tour was the first and only tour to feature the group's second lineup, "The New Santana Band", consisting of guitarist Carlos Santana, percussionists Armando Peraza and José Areas, bassist Doug Rauch, drummer Michael Shrieve, and Tom Coster and Richard Kermode on keyboards. The group often performed material from Caravanserai along with other improvisations and covers.

Some concerts were recorded and filmed and released as albums and films. The shows on July 3 and 4, 1973 at the Osaka Kōsei Nenkin Kaikan in Osaka, Japan were released as the triple vinyl LP Lotus (1974). Select concerts during the tour's Latin American portion were filmed and incorporated into the documentary, Santana en Colores (1973).

History 
On October 11, 1972, Santana released Caravanserai, a major turning point in Carlos Santana's career. The album aimed towards a more experimental jazz fusion sound, a contrast from the group's earlier releases. In the same year, Santana became interested in the jazz fusion outfit Mahavishnu Orchestra and its guitarist, John McLaughlin. Aware of Santana's interest in meditation, McLaughlin introduced Santana, and his girlfriend Deborah, to his guru, Sri Chinmoy in October. Later in the month, Chinmoy accepted the Santanas as disciples. Santana was given the name Devadip, meaning "the lamp, light and eye of God" in August 1973. Santana and McLaughlin recorded an album together, Love Devotion Surrender with members of Santana and the Mahavishnu Orchestra in 1973. After becoming a disciple of the guru, Santana got his hair cut short and he started to dress in white clothes.

Some time later, Santana, having obtained legal rights to the band's name, Santana, formed a new version of the band with renowned Latin jazz percussionist Armando Peraza and Nicaraguan percussionist José Areas, Doug Rauch on bass, Michael Shrieve on drums, and Tom Coster and Richard Kermode on keyboards. Dubbed "The New Santana Band", they toured North America, South America, Europe, Asia, and Oceania in support of Caravanserai, travelling in a Lockheed L-188 Electra airliner, which generated a lot of buzz in Australia.

At the start of the European tour of 1972, a press conference was held in the afternoon of November 4, 1972, before the concert at London's Empire Pool, where Santana answered questions about his new look and spiritual direction. His devotion to Chinmoy was evident during the press conference, as a picture of Jesus was perched on top of an amplifier next to a photo of the guru during the conference. The band followed this European tour with a North American tour lasting from December 1972 to June 1973. During April to June 1973, the group took a break to record their fifth studio album, Welcome. This album was much more experimental than Santana's previous albums, and did not produce any hit singles. Though the tour mainly promoted Caravanserai, songs from upcoming Santana albums were played during this tour, such as tracks from Welcome: "Going Home", "Samba de Sausalito", "When I Look into Your Eyes", "Yours Is the Light", "Light of Life", "Welcome", and "Mantra".

After the conclusion of the North American tour, an Asian tour started, where the group played in Japan, Hong Kong and Malaysia. The tour of Asia was followed by a tour of Australia and New Zealand. Another North American tour followed, and the group subsequently toured Latin America.

The tour of Latin America in late 1973 was announced around September 22, and it generated a lot of publicity as it was one of the first, if not the first, tour of Latin America by a major American rock act. When the group arrived at La Aurora International Airport in Guatemala on September 26, 1973, they were received by the daughter of President Carlos Manuel Arana Osorio and they answered questions by reporters. Later that day, the band did a benefit concert at Estadio Nacional Mateo Flores organized by First Lady Álida España and Vice President Eduardo Cáceres.

When the band landed at Las Mercedes Airport in Managua, Nicaragua on October 2, 1973, a swarm of fans mobbed the group when they were boarding their tour bus. Percussionist José Areas, who is Nicaraguan, was given a standing ovation by the crowd. Santana met up with former President Anastasio Somoza Debayle, while Areas privately traveled to León to see his family. At 8 p.m. on October 3, the group did a free benefit concert for victims of the 1972 Nicaragua earthquake at Estadio Nacional Somoza.

During October 6, 1973, at the Plaza de toros Monumental de Valencia in Valencia, Venezuela, two fans died at the concert, one man committed suicide by jumping from a tall structure located in the bullring, and a woman suffocated. In Caracas, there was a riot between the concert-goers and the police over the constant marijuana usage at the performance which resulted in hundreds of fans being detained and fifteen officials injuring themselves in the fight.

Tour band 
 Leon Thomas – lead vocals, sound effects, percussion (beginning June 21, 1973)
 Carlos Santana – guitar, Echoplex, percussion, vocals
 Tom Coster – Yamaha organ, Hammond organ, electric piano, percussion, vocals
 Richard Kermode – Hammond organ, Mellotron, piano, electric piano, percussion, vocals
 Doug Rauch – bass guitar
 Michael Shrieve – drums
 José "Chepito" Areas – timbales, congas, percussion, vocals
 Armando Peraza – bongos, congas, percussion
 James "Mingo" Lewis – congas, percussion (through April 8, 1973)

Typical set lists

September–October 1972: First North American tour 
A 16-date tour of North America started on September 4, 1972, at the Erie Canal Soda Pop Festival, held near Griffin, Indiana on Bull Island and ended on October 30, 1972 at the Academy of Music in New York City. This is a usual set list for this leg (actual set list taken from the October 15 Seattle show):

 "A-1 Funk" (Carlos Santana, Tom Coster, Richard Kermode, Doug Rauch, Michael Shrieve, José Areas, Armando Peraza)
 "Every Step of the Way" (Shrieve)
 "Samba Pa Ti" (Santana)
 "Look Up (To See What's Coming Down)" (Rauch, Gregg Rolie, Santana)
 "Just in Time to See the Sun" (Rolie, Santana, Shrieve)
 "Incident at Neshabur" (Alberto Gianquinto, Santana)
 "Bambele" (Areas, Peraza)
 "Stone Flower" (Antônio Carlos Jobim)
 "Xibaba (She-Ba-Ba)" (Airto Moreira)
 "Castillos de Arena Part 1 (Sand Castle)" (Joaquim Young, Santana, Coster, Kermode, Rauch, Shrieve, Areas, Peraza, Chick Corea)	
 "Free Angela" (Todd Cochran)
 "Mantra" (Coster, Santana, Shrieve)
 "Castillos de Arena Part 2 (Sand Castle)" (Corea, Young, Santana, Coster, Kermode, Rauch, Shrieve, Areas, Peraza)
 "Earth"
 "Se Acabó" (Areas)
 "Savor" (Areas, David Brown, Michael Carabello, Rolie, Santana, Shrieve)
 "Toussaint L'Ouverture" (Areas, Brown, Carabello, Rolie, Santana, Shrieve)
 "Welcome" (John Coltrane)
 "La Fuente del Ritmo" (Mingo Lewis)

On the other hand, the concert on September 12, 1972 at the Keystone in Berkeley, California was very different from the usual set list, as more songs from Caravanserai were performed on this date. The set list for this performance was as follows:

 "Eternal Caravanserai Of Reincarnation" (Tom Rutley, Neal Schon, Shrieve)
 "Waves Within" (Rauch, Rolie, Santana)
 "Look Up (To See What's Coming Down)" (Rauch, Rolie, Santana)
 "Just in Time to See the Sun" (Rolie, Santana, Shrieve)
 "Incident at Neshabur" (Gianquinto, Santana)
 "Se Acabó" (Areas)
 "Bambele" (Areas, Peraza)
 "Stone Flower" (Antônio Carlos Jobim)
 "Batukada" (Santana, Coster, Kermode, Rauch, Shrieve, Areas, Peraza)
 "Xibaba (She-Ba-Ba)" (Airto Moreira)
 "Castillos de Arena Part 1 (Sand Castle)" (Joaquim Young, Santana, Coster, Kermode, Rauch, Shrieve, Areas, Peraza, Corea)
 "Free Angela" (Cochran)
 "Castillos de Arena Part 2 (Sand Castle)" (Corea, Young, Santana, Coster, Kermode, Rauch, Shrieve, Areas, Peraza)
 "Earth"
 "La Fuente del Ritmo" (Lewis)
 "Welcome" (Coltrane)
 "Every Step of the Way" (Shrieve)

November–December 1972: First tour of Europe 
The band started a European tour on November 4, 1972 at Empire Pool in London, England, concluding on December 5, 1972 at Philips Halle in Düsseldorf, West Germany. New additions to the set list include "Going Home", which opened every concert during the entire tour, and the instrumental "Samba Pa Ti". Here is a common set list for this leg (actual set list taken from the December 1 Rotterdam gig):

 "Going Home" (Anton Dvorák; arranged by Alice Coltrane, Santana, Coster, Kermode, Rauch, Shrieve, Areas, Peraza)
 "A-1 Funk" (Santana, Coster, Kermode, Rauch, Shrieve, Areas, Peraza)
 "Every Step of the Way" (Shrieve)
 "Samba Pa Ti" (Santana)
 "Look Up (To See What's Coming Down)" (Rauch, Rolie, Santana)
 "Just in Time to See the Sun" (Rolie, Santana, Shrieve)
 "Incident at Neshabur" (Gianquinto, Santana)
 "Bambele" (Areas, Peraza)
 "Stone Flower" (Jobim)
 "Batukada" (Santana, Coster, Kermode, Rauch, Shrieve, Areas, Peraza)
 "Xibaba (She-Ba-Ba)" (Moreira)
 "Waiting" (Santana)
 "Castillos de Arena Part 1 (Sand Castle)" (Joaquim Young, Santana, Coster, Kermode, Rauch, Shrieve, Areas, Peraza, Corea)
 "Free Angela" (Cochran)
 "Mantra" (Coster, Santana, Shrieve)
 "Castillos de Arena Part 2 (Sand Castle)" (Corea, Young, Santana, Coster, Kermode, Rauch, Shrieve, Areas, Peraza)
 "Earth"
 "Se Acabó" (Areas)
 "Savor" (Areas, Brown, Carabello, Rolie, Santana, Shrieve)
 "Toussaint L'Ouverture" (Areas, Brown, Carabello, Rolie, Santana, Shrieve)

December 1972–June 1973: Second tour of North America 
A tour of North America began on December 9, 1972 at Loyola Field House in New Orleans, Louisiana and ended on June 21, 1973 at the Anchorage Sports Arena in Anchorage, Alaska. A new song, "Kyoto", was added to the set list. Here is a typical set list for this leg (actual set list taken from the January 30 San Diego show):

 "Going Home" (Dvorák; arr.: Coltrane, Santana, Coster, Kermode, Rauch, Shrieve, Areas, Peraza)
 "A-1 Funk" (Santana, Coster, Kermode, Rauch, Shrieve, Areas, Peraza)
 "Every Step of the Way" (Shrieve)
 "Samba Pa Ti" (Santana)
 "Look Up (To See What's Coming Down)" (Rauch, Rolie, Santana)
 "Just in Time to See the Sun" (Rolie, Santana, Shrieve)
 "Incident at Neshabur" (Gianquinto, Santana)
 "Bambele" (Areas, Peraza)
 "Stone Flower" (Jobim)
 "Batukada" (Santana, Coster, Kermode, Rauch, Shrieve, Areas, Peraza)
 "Xibaba (She-Ba-Ba)" (Moreira)
 "Waiting" (Santana)
 "Castillos de Arena Part 1 (Sand Castle)" (Joaquim Young, Santana, Coster, Kermode, Rauch, Shrieve, Areas, Peraza, Chick Corea)	
 "Free Angela" (Todd Cochran)
 Concierto de Aranjuez (Joaquín Rodrigo)
 "Mantra" (Coster, Santana, Shrieve)
 "Kyoto" (Shrieve)
 "Castillos de Arena Part 2 (Sand Castle)" (Corea, Young, Santana, Coster, Kermode, Rauch, Shrieve, Areas, Peraza)
 "Earth"
 "Se Acabó" (Areas)
 "Savor" (Areas, Brown, Carabello, Rolie, Santana, Shrieve)
 "Toussaint L'Ouverture" (Areas, Brown, Carabello, Rolie, Santana, Shrieve)

June–July 1973: Asian tour 
The group started their very first tour of Asia on June 27, 1973 at the Fukuoka Kyuden Kinen Gymnasium in Fukuoka, Japan and ended on July 19, 1973 at Stadium Negara in Kuala Lumpur, Malaysia. A live album, Lotus, was recorded during this tour. The album's track listing is as follows:

 "Going Home" (Dvorák; arr.: Coltrane, Santana, Coster, Kermode, Rauch, Shrieve, Areas, Peraza)
 "A-1 Funk" (Santana, Coster, Kermode, Rauch, Shrieve, Areas, Peraza)
 "Every Step of the Way" (Shrieve)
 "Black Magic Woman" (Peter Green)
 "Gypsy Queen" (Gábor Szabó)
 "Oye Como Va" (Tito Puente)
 "Japan" (Hayashi, Matsuhima; arr.: Santana, Kermode, Shrieve, Rauch, Coster, Peraza, Areas)
 "Bambele" (Areas, Peraza)
 "Um Um Um" (Leon Thomas)
 "Yours Is the Light" (Kermode)
 "Batukada" (Santana, Coster, Kermode, Rauch, Shrieve, Areas, Peraza)
 "Xibaba (She-Ba-Ba)" (Moreira)
 "Stone Flower (Introduction)" (Jobim)
 "Waiting" (Santana)
 "Castillos de Arena Part 1 (Sand Castle)" (Young, Santana, Coster, Kermode, Rauch, Shrieve, Areas, Peraza, Corea)	
 "Free Angela" (Cochran)
 "Samba de Sausalito" (Areas)
 "Mantra" (Coster, Santana, Shrieve)
 "Kyoto" (Shrieve)
 "Castillos de Arena Part 2 (Sand Castle)" (Corea, Young, Santana, Coster, Kermode, Rauch, Shrieve, Areas, Peraza)
 "Light of Life" (Santana, Kermode, Coster)
 "Se Acabó" (Areas)
 "Samba Pa Ti" (Santana)
 "Mr. Udo" (Santana, Coster, Kermode, Rauch, Shrieve, Areas, Peraza)
 "The Creator Has a Master Plan" (Thomas, Pharoah Sanders)
 "Savor" (Areas, Brown, Carabello, Rolie, Santana, Shrieve)
 "Conga Solo" (Peraza)
 "Toussaint L'Ouverture" (Areas, Brown, Carabello, Rolie, Santana, Shrieve)
 "Incident at Neshabur" (Gianquinto, Santana)

July–August 1973: Oceanic tour 
The group's first tour of Oceania lasted from July 23, 1973 at Brisbane Festival Hall in Brisbane, Australia to August 8, 1973 at Christchurch Town Hall in Christchurch, New Zealand. No set list information exists of this leg, but the set lists were reportedly similar to the previous ones.

August–October 1973: Third North American tour 
The band did another North American tour from August 12, 1973 at Roosevelt Stadium in Jersey City, New Jersey to October 3, 1973 at Estadio Nacional Somoza in Managua, Nicaragua. Mexican television crews taped the shows at the Auditorio de la Reforma in Puebla, Mexico on September 22–23, 1973. Here is a typical set list for this leg (actual set list taken from the August 12 Jersey City show):

 "Going Home" (Dvorák; arr.: Coltrane, Santana, Coster, Kermode, Rauch, Shrieve, Areas, Peraza)
 "A-1 Funk" (Santana, Coster, Kermode, Rauch, Shrieve, Areas, Peraza)
 "Every Step of the Way" (Shrieve)
 "Black Magic Woman" (Green)
 "Gypsy Queen" (Szabó)
 "Oye Como Va" (Puente)
 "Japan" (Hayashi, Matsuhima; arr.: Santana, Kermode, Shrieve, Rauch, Coster, Peraza, Areas)
 "Bambele" (Areas, Peraza)
 "Um Um Um" (Thomas)
 "Yours Is the Light" (Kermode)
 "Batukada" (Santana, Coster, Kermode, Rauch, Shrieve, Areas, Peraza)
 "Xibaba (She-Ba-Ba)" (Moreira)
 "Stone Flower (Introduction)" (Jobim)
 "Waiting" (Santana)
 "Castillos de Arena Part 1 (Sand Castle)" (Young, Santana, Coster, Kermode, Rauch, Shrieve, Areas, Peraza, Corea)	
 "Free Angela" (Cochran)
 "Samba de Sausalito" (Areas)
 "Castillos de Arena Part 2 (Sand Castle)" (Corea, Young, Santana, Coster, Kermode, Rauch, Shrieve, Areas, Peraza)
 "Light of Life" (Santana, Kermode, Coster)
 "Se Acabó" (Areas)
 "Mr. Udo" (Santana, Coster, Kermode, Rauch, Shrieve, Areas, Peraza)
 "The Creator Has a Master Plan" (Thomas, Sanders)
 "Savor" (Areas, Brown, Carabello, Rolie, Santana, Shrieve)
 "Toussaint L'Ouverture" (Areas, Brown, Carabello, Rolie, Santana, Shrieve)
 "Samba Pa Ti" (Santana)
 "Incident at Neshabur" (Gianquinto, Santana)

October 1973: Tour of South America 
A series of shows in South America began on October 5, 1973 at Plaza de toros Monumental de Maracaibo in Maracaibo, Venezuela and ended on October 21, 1973 at Ginasio Municipal Novo in Brasília, Brazil. Here is a typical set list for this leg (actual set list taken from the October 19 São Paulo show):

 "Going Home" (Dvorák; arr.: Coltrane, Santana, Coster, Kermode, Rauch, Shrieve, Areas, Peraza)
 "A-1 Funk" (Santana, Coster, Kermode, Rauch, Shrieve, Areas, Peraza)
 "Every Step of the Way" (Shrieve)
 "Black Magic Woman" (Green)
 "Gypsy Queen" (Szabó)
 "Oye Como Va" (Puente)
 "Bambele" (Areas, Peraza)
 "Um Um Um" (Thomas)
 "Yours Is the Light" (Kermode)
 "Batukada" (Santana, Coster, Kermode, Rauch, Shrieve, Areas, Peraza)
 "Xibaba (She-Ba-Ba)" (Moreira)
 "Stone Flower (Introduction)" (Jobim)
 "Waiting" (Santana)
 "Castillos de Arena Part 1 (Sand Castle)" (Young, Santana, Coster, Kermode, Rauch, Shrieve, Areas, Peraza, Corea)	
 "Free Angela" (Cochran)
 Concierto de Aranjuez (Rodrigo)
 "Samba de Sausalito" (Areas)
 "Castillos de Arena Part 2 (Sand Castle)" (Corea, Young, Santana, Coster, Kermode, Rauch, Shrieve, Areas, Peraza)
 "Se Acabó" (Areas)
 "Samba Pa Ti" (Santana)
 "Savor" (Areas, Brown, Carabello, Rolie, Santana, Shrieve)
 "Toussaint L'Ouverture" (Areas, Brown, Carabello, Rolie, Santana, Shrieve)

Live releases 
Live material from this tour has appeared on the following releases:

 The shows on July 3 and 4, 1973 at the Osaka Kōsei Nenkin Kaikan in Osaka, Japan were released as the triple vinyl LP Lotus.
 Fragments of shows from the Central and South American concerts of this tour were used in the 1973 concert film Santana en Colores.
 "Samba Pa Ti" from Santana en Colores, filmed on September 28, 1973 at Gimnasio Nacional José Adolfo Pineda in San Salvador, El Salvador was released on the video Viva Santana! An Intimate Conversation With Carlos Santana in 1988.

Reception 
During the band's first North American tour in 1972, it was reported that "the crowds were sparer than expected in a few spots than the last tour, but there were standing ovations in San Francisco and New York, and encores almost everywhere else." However, in a review for The Stanford Daily, reporter Don Tollefson gave their performance at San Francisco's Winterland Ballroom on April 6, 1973 a poor review, saying that the talent of the members was underutilized, and one of the other acts on the bill, Focus, delivered a better performance than headliner Santana. Additionally, the band's shows in Venezuela and Colombia were negatively received by the media.

Tour dates

North American leg (September 4 – October 30, 1972)

European leg (November 4 – December 5, 1972)

North American leg (December 9, 1972 – June 21, 1973)

Asian leg (June 27 – July 19, 1973)

Australasian leg (July 23 – August 8, 1973)

North American leg (August 12 – October 3, 1973)

South American leg (October 5–21, 1973)

Unknown dates

Notes

Footnotes

References

External links 
 Santana Past Shows 1972 at Santana official website
 Santana Past Shows 1973 at Santana official website

Santana (band) concert tours
1972 concert tours
1973 concert tours
Concert tours of North America
Concert tours of Europe
Concert tours of Asia
Concert tours of Oceania
Concert tours of South America